The Gaylord-Pickens Museum is in Oklahoma City, Oklahoma, United States. It is home to the Oklahoma Hall of Fame and features interactive exhibits relating Oklahoma's history. It is located in the Mid-Continental Life building and includes a theater.

References

External links
Oklahoma Hall of Fame website

Museums in Oklahoma City
History museums in Oklahoma
State history organizations of the United States